Kathleen Openda-Mvati is a Kenyan journalist and former television host with the Kenya Television Network (KTN).

She received an Eisenhower Fellowship and was a Chevening Scholar. In 2018, she was appointed Chairperson of the Council of the Kenya Institute of Mass Communication (KIMC).

References 

Living people
Kenyan journalists
Kenyan women journalists
Kenyan television journalists
Kenyan women television journalists
Kenyan television presenters
Kenyan women television presenters
Year of birth missing (living people)